Lysva is a town in Perm Krai, Russia, located in the eastern part of the krai on the river Lysva,  from Perm. Population:

History
Lysva as a settlement was known in the middle of the 17th century. The lands around Lysva in the second half of the 18th century were inherited by the daughter of Baron Stroganov, Princess Shakhovskaya. In 1785 construction of the cast-iron foundry began. This year is officially considered the year of Lysva foundation. In 1902 owing to construction of the railway branch the plant, which had been producing iron from the imported pig-iron by that time, obtained a wide access to the country markets.

On the 5th of April, 1926 Presidium of All-Russian Central Executive Committee had granted Lysva city status.  After Great Patriotic War in Lysva began development of mechanical engineering, light industry. In the 1950th centre of the city was built up. In 1960-1980 years city extended its borders by building of new dwelling microdistricts. 

Today Lysva is one of the most important industrial and cultural centres of the Perm Krai.

Administrative and municipal status
Within the framework of administrative divisions, it is, together with fifty-nine rural localities, incorporated as the town of krai significance of Lysva—an administrative unit with the status equal to that of the districts. As a municipal division, the town of krai significance of Lysva is incorporated as Lysvensky Urban Okrug.

Economy
The town's major industries are machine building and metalworking. Products manufactured by the town's workers include sheet iron, oil extraction equipment, and electric motors.

Transportation
There are non-electrified railway lines running through town to connect Lysva with Kalino station on the Gornozavodsk railway line.

References

Notes

Sources

Cities and towns in Perm Krai
Permsky Uyezd